Charles Zachary Wilson is an American economist who is Professor Emeritus at UCLA's Graduate School of Education.  He was the first Black individual to serve as an Academic Vice-Chancellor in the University of California System, and was among the founders of the National Economic Association.

Education and early life 

Born in the Mississippi Delta, Wilson earned a B.S. (1952) and PhD (1956) in Economics and Statistics from the University of Illinois, completed post-doctoral training in Engineering Economics at the Illinois Institute of Technology in 1959, and later trained in Family Counseling at California State University, Northridge and Management for Entrepreneurs at UCLA.

Career 
Wilson taught at DePaul University's School of Business and then at SUNY-Binghamton, where he became the first Black full professor on that faculty. He joined UCLA in 1968 as a Professor in the Graduate School of Education. In 1970, he became Vice-Chancellor of Academic Programs, where he served until 1984. From 1985 to 1996 he was Publisher of Central News-Wave Publications, Inc, one of the largest black newspapers in the United States.

Selected works 

 Wilson, Charles Z., and Marcus Alexis. "Basic frameworks for decisions." Academy of Management Journal 5, no. 2 (1962): 150–164.
 Alexis, Marcus, Thaddeus Spratlen, and Charles Z. Wilson. "Robert Browne and the Caucus of black economics." The Review of Black Political Economy 35, no. 2-3 (2008): 61–66.
 Wilson, Charles Z. "Organization Theory: A Survey of Three Views." The Quarterly Review of Economics and Business 1 (1961).
 Wilson, Charles Z., and Marcus Alexis. "Organizational Decision-Making"
 Wilson, Charles Z., "Crossing Organizational Boundaries By Choice"

References 

American economists
African-American economists
Living people
Year of birth missing (living people)
DePaul University faculty
Binghamton University faculty
UCLA Graduate School of Education and Information Studies faculty
American newspaper publishers (people)
Presidents of the National Economic Association
21st-century African-American people